Leventhorpe School is a mixed, 11-19 secondary school and sixth form in the town of Sawbridgeworth, Hertfordshire. The school became an academy in August 2011, and is part of the Rivers Multi-Academy Trust.

As of 2018, the school's last inspection was in 2012 when it was judged Outstanding in each of the five categories.

In 2017, the school's Progress 8 score at GCSE was -0.08, in line with the England average, and the Attainment 8 score was 53 points, above the England and Hertfordshire averages. In 2018, GCSE results "exceed[ed] national targets".

The average grade at A level in 2018 was C, just below the England and Hertfordshire averages of C+. Absence and persistent absence were better than the England average for 2016/17.

Notable former pupils
 Dodie Clark, YouTuber and musician
 Andrew Osagie, athlete
 Adam Smith, footballer

References

Academies in Hertfordshire
Secondary schools in Hertfordshire
Sawbridgeworth
1965 establishments in England
Educational institutions established in 1965